All Neat in Black Stockings is a 1969 British comedy film directed by Christopher Morahan and starring Victor Henry, Susan George and Jack Shepherd. Based on a novel by Jane Gaskell, its plot follows an easygoing window cleaner called 'Ginger' who falls in love with a woman he meets in Swinging London.  The film is in the British New Wave tradition and shows the blue collar working man lifestyle.  The film is a 1960s time capsule of cars, dress and dancing (even Old Spice cologne and Pepsi bottles).

Plot
Ginger (Victor Henry) is a window cleaner with an eye for the girls.  His best friend and neighbour, Dwyer, (Jack Shepherd) swaps girls with him.  Ginger is cleaning hospital windows and he sets up a date with nurse Babette (Jasmina Hilton).  A patient gives Ginger the keys to his house and asks him to care for his pets during his hospital stay.  Ginger takes Babette to the local pub but his interest wanders to Carole (Vanessa Forsythe) and Jill (Susan George). He sets up a date with Carole and later that night he switches date Babette with Dwyer.  Best friends share everything.

Ginger cares for Mr. McLaughlin's birds, rabbits, white rats and many aquaria.  This home is far nicer than Ginger's run down bedsit.  In fact his pushy brother-in-law moves in with Ginger's pregnant sister, Cecily (Anna Cropper). Issur (Harry Towb) even moves in with his girlfriend, Jocasta (Nita Lorraine).  Ginger's passive and uncomplaining sister seems not to object.

Ginger takes Carole ice skating, but his interest moves to her friend, Jill.  He starts seeing Jill and even buys her a large plush penguin. He meets Jill's mother and Dwyer sees a difference in his friend. Ginger does not even try to have sex with Jill.  Jill and her mother live together and Ginger befriends Mum.

Issur decides to have a large unauthorised party in the borrowed residence. Angry Ginger shows up and starts to kick people out of the house, which has been trashed.  Later that night, Ginger finds Jill in bed with Dwyer. She has lost her virginity to Dwyer, who thought nothing was wrong because they always slept with each other's women. Brother-in-law goes off to Mexico with Jocasta and Jill ends up pregnant to Dwyer.

House-sitting man (Terence de Marney) returns from hospital to find his pets hungry and possessions damaged. He nonetheless hires Cecily as his housekeeper. Despite all, Ginger decides to marry Jill, and makes a deposit on a rental property, but Jill decides they will live with her mother. Jill has the baby and Ginger says it looks like Dwyer. Ginger continues work cleaning windows and stops for lunch at a café. The waitress is young and pretty and Ginger flirts with her and the movie ends.

Cast
 Victor Henry - Ginger - Window-washer
 Susan George - Jillian 'Jill'
 Jack Shepherd - Dwyer - Best Mate
 Clare Kelly - Jill's Mother
 Anna Cropper - Cicely 'Sis'
 Harry Towb - Sister's Husband, Issur
 Vanessa Forsyth - Carole - Jill's friend
 Terence De Marney - Old Gunge - Owner of home with pets
 Jasmina Hilton - Nurse Babette
 John Woodnutt - Vicar
 Nita Lorraine - Jocasta - Issur's girlfriend
 Deirdre Costello - New Bird
 Andre Dakar - Man with parrot
 Rosalind Elliot - New Bird
 Gwendolyn Watts - Suburban housewife
 Anna Welsh - Hospital Sister
 Neil Wilson - Angry householder
 Christine Pryor - Cafe waitress
 Grahame James - Young bloke
 Eric Longworth - Businessman
 Malcolm Tierney - Photographer
 Maurice Travers - Car salesman
 Carmen Munroe - Nurse
 Larry Dann - New mate

References

External links
 
 Turner Classic Movies: All Neat in Black Stockings.
 British Film Institute Film & TV Database: All Neat in Black Stockings.
 Paul Lewis's review of All Neat in Black Stockings.
 MP3-Samples of the soundtrack All Neat In Black Stockings. Tape 105 contains Instrumentals (Soloist Tony Coe and Soloist Kenny Wheeler. Tape 5302 contains two vocal numbers from the film sung by Jon Mark: "All Neat In Black Stockings" / "Run To Me" (Philips UK BF 1772, April 1969).

1968 films
British comedy films
1968 comedy films
1960s English-language films
Films directed by Christopher Morahan
1960s British films